This is a list of Swiss poets, consisting of both authors native to Switzerland, and authors born elsewhere who have influenced Swiss literature through their work. Swiss literature may be split into four parts based on the language of the author, although some authors may write in multiple languages. (Years link to corresponding "[year] in poetry" articles.)

French language
Raphaël Aubert (born 1953)
S. Corinna Bille (1912–1979)
Blaise Cendrars  (Frédéric Louis Sauser) (1887–1961)
Maurice Chappaz (1916–2009)
Pierre Chappuis (1930–2020)
Victor Cherbuliez (1829–1899)
Jacques Chessex (1934–2009)
Anne Cuneo (1936–2015)
Markus Hediger (born 1959)
Jeanne Hersch (1910–2000)
Philippe Jaccottet (1925–2021)
Ella Maillart (1903–1997)
Pierrette Micheloud (1915–2007)
Marc Monnier (1827–1885)
Suzanne Necker, née Suzanne Curchod (1739–1794)
Juste Olivier (1807–1876)
Guy de Pourtalès (1881–1941)
Eugène Rambert (1830–1886)
Charles Ferdinand Ramuz (1878–1947)
Grisélidis Réal (1929–2005)
Alice Rivaz (1901–1998)
Gustave Roud (1897–1976)
Léon Savary (1895–1968)
Anne Louise Germaine de Staël (Madame de Staël) (1766–1817)
Jean-Pierre Vallotton (born 1955)

German language
Jürg Amann (1947–2013)
Peter Bichsel (born 1935)
Silvio Blatter (born 1946)
Hermann Burger (1942–1989)
Erika Burkart (1922–2010)
Martin R. Dean (born 1955)
Rolf Dobelli (born 1966)
Friedrich Dürrenmatt (1921–1990)
Marianne Ehrmann (1755–1795)
Jürg Federspiel (1931–2007)
Max Frisch (1911–1991)
Salomon Gessner (1730–1788)
Friedrich Glauser (1896–1938)
Eugen Gomringer (born 1925)
Jeremias Gotthelf (Albert Bitzius) (1797–1854)
Albrecht von Haller (1708–1777)
Eveline Hasler (born 1933)
Ludwig Hohl (1904–1980)
Franz Hohler (born 1943)
Gardi Hutter (born 1953)
Pierre Imhasly (1939–2017)
Zoë Jenny (born 1974)
Gottfried Keller (1819–1890)
Christian Kracht (born 1966)
Heinrich Leuthold (1827–1879)
Hugo Loetscher (born 1929)
Kurt Marti (High German and Swiss-German) (1921–2017)
Niklaus Meienberg (1940–1993)
Conrad Ferdinand Meyer (1825–1898)
Adolf Muschg (born 1934)
Erica Pedretti (1930–2022)
Johann Gaudenz von Salis-Seewis (1762–1834)
Jakob Schaffner (1875–1944)
René Sommer (born 1954)
Gerold Späth (born 1939)
Carl Spitteler (1845–1924)
Johanna Spyri (1827–1901)
Peter Stamm (born 1963)
Albert Steffen (1884–1963)
Gottfried Strasser (1854-1912)
Martin Suter (born 1948)
Raphael Urweider (born 1974)
Johann Martin Usteri (1763–1828)
Robert Walser (1878–1956)
Silja Walter (1919–2011)
Markus Werner (1944–2016)
Johann Rudolf Wyss (1781–1830)
Werner Zemp (1906–1959)
Albin Zollinger (1885–1941)
Fritz Zorn (1944–1976)
Roland Zoss (born 1951)
Johann Heinrich Daniel Zschokke (1771–1848)

Italian language
Giorgio Orelli (1921–2013)
Giovanni Orelli (1928–2016)
Fabio Pusterla (born 1957)
Pierre Lepori (born 1968)

Romansh language
Peider Lansel (1863–1943)

Notes and references

See also 
 Swiss literature

Swiss